Pete Kaululaau Gustave Thompson (1949March 2, 2015) was an activist and professor in the Ethnic Studies department at the University of Hawaiʻi at Mānoa. He is best known for his work in the Waiāhole-Waikāne struggle and the protests against the construction of the Interstate H-3.

Early life and education 
Thompson was born in Honolulu in 1949. He graduated from Kamehameha Schools in 1967.

Career 
As a professor, Thompson helped to write the first curriculum about Native Hawaiians to be taught at the University of Hawaiʻi at Mānoa. He also did most of his activism while working as a professor, including acting as a founding member of the Kokua Kalama Committee, and acting as chairman of "For People, Land and Sea, Stop TH-3", a community opposing development of the Interstate H-3. He was well-known as a Marxist, and a community organizer with the Waiāhole-Waikāne Community Association. Thompson's interest and support of land rights extended into the greater Pacific, with his attendance at events like the conference in 1974/1975 for a Nuclear Free Pacific.

After working as a professor he became an investment broker at Smith Barney, ranking 51st in the United States in 2008. He also served as a board member for the Hawaii People’s Fund and the Hawaii Institute of Public Affairs.

Thompson died on March 2, 2015.

References

External links 

 Photographs of Pete Thompson taken by Ed Greevy (via Ulukau)

1949 births
Kamehameha Schools alumni
Native Hawaiian academics
University of Hawaiʻi faculty
2015 deaths
Native Hawaiian activists